Tony Wong may refer to:
 Tony Wong, politician in Ontario, Canada
 Wong Yuk-long, birth name of comics creator Tony Wong

See also
Anthony Wong (disambiguation)